The master race, or Herrenvolk, is a concept of racial superiority, mainly linked with Nazi Germany.

Master Race may also refer to:

Film and television
The Master Race (film) an American film Anne Froelick
"Master Race - 1933", episode of documentary series People's Century

Books
Master Race, a 1955 book by Keith Botsford
"Master Race" (EC Comics), a 1955 EC Comics short story drawn by Bernard Krigstein
The Dark Knight III: The Master Race, a 2015 comic series

Music
"Master Race" by New Model Army from The Ghost of Cain 1986
"Master Race" by Rick Wakeman composed Wakeman from Lisztomania 1975
"Master Race (In Outer Space)" by The Vandals Composed by Joe Escalante from When in Rome Do as The Vandals 1984
"No Master Race" by The Unseen from The Anger and the Truth
"Master Race Rock", by The Dictators, Andy Shernoff from Go Girl Crazy! 1975

Other
PC Master Race, a term used by gamers using personal computers to refer to themselves

See also
Herrenvolk (disambiguation)